

Events 
Below, the events of World War I have the "WWI" prefix.

January 

January – British physicist Sir Joseph Larmor publishes his observations on "The Influence of Local Atmospheric Cooling on Astronomical Refraction".
January 1
 WWI: British Royal Navy battleship HMS Formidable is sunk off Lyme Regis, Dorset, England, by an Imperial German Navy U-boat, with the loss of 547 crew.
Battle of Broken Hill: A train ambush near Broken Hill, Australia, is carried out by two men (claiming to be in support of the Ottoman Empire) who are killed, together with four civilians.
 January 12
 The United States House of Representatives rejects a proposal to give women the right to vote.
 A Fool There Was premières in the United States, starring Theda Bara as a femme fatale; she quickly becomes one of early cinema's most sensational stars.
 January 17 – WWI: Caucasus Campaign – Battle of Sarikamish: Russia defeats Ottoman Turkey.
 January 18 – Twenty-One Demands from Japan to China are made.
 January 19
 Georges Claude patents the neon discharge tube for use in advertising.
 WWI: German Zeppelins bomb the coastal towns of Great Yarmouth and King's Lynn in England for the first time, killing more than 20.
 January 21 – Kiwanis is founded in Detroit, Michigan, as The Supreme Lodge Benevolent Order Brothers.
 January 23 – Chilembwe uprising: Baptist minister John Chilembwe initiates an ultimately unsuccessful uprising against British colonial rule in Nyasaland (modern-day Malawi).
 January 24 – WWI: Battle of Dogger Bank: The British Grand Fleet defeats the German High Seas Fleet, sinking the armoured cruiser .
 January 25 - The first United States coast-to-coast long-distance telephone call is facilitated by a newly invented vacuum tube amplifier, ceremonially inaugurated by Alexander Graham Bell in New York City and his former assistant Thomas A. Watson, in San Francisco, California.
 January 26
 WWI: The Ottoman Army begins the Raid on the Suez Canal.
 The Rocky Mountain National Park is established by an act of the United States Congress.
 January 27 – WWI: French military casualties begin arriving at the Hôpital Temporaire d'Arc-en-Barrois, established earlier in the month by British volunteers.
 January 28 – An act of the United States Congress designates the United States Coast Guard, began in 1790, as a military branch.
 January 31 – WWI: Battle of Bolimów – Germany's first large-scale use of poison gas as a weapon occurs, when 18,000 artillery shells containing liquid xylyl bromide tear gas are fired on the Imperial Russian Army, on the Rawka River west of Warsaw; however, freezing temperatures prevent it being effective.

February 

 February – While working as a cook at New York's Sloane Hospital for Women under an assumed name, "Typhoid Mary" (an asymptomatic carrier of typhoid fever) infects 25 people, and is placed in quarantine for life on March 27.
 February 4 – The Maritz Rebellion of disaffected Boers against the government of the Union of South Africa ends with the surrender of the remaining rebels.
 February 8 – The controversial film The Birth of a Nation, directed by D. W. Griffith, premieres in Los Angeles. It will be the highest-grossing film for around 25 years.
 February 18 – WWI: Germany regards the waters around the British Isles to be a war zone from this date, as part of its U-boat Campaign.
 February 20 – In San Francisco, the Panama–Pacific International Exposition is opened.
 February 25 – Armenian genocide: The Ottoman Empire transfers Armenians from its armed forces to unarmed Ottoman labour battalions.

March 

 March – The 1915 Palestine locust infestation breaks out in Palestine; it continues until October.
 March 2 – Armenian genocide: Earliest recorded deportations.
 March 10–13 – WWI: Battle of Neuve Chapelle – In the first deliberately planned British offensive of the war, British Indian troops overrun German positions in France, but are unable to sustain the advance.
 March 11 – WWI: British armed merchantman  is sunk in the North Channel off the coast of Scotland by Imperial German Navy U-boat SM U-27. Around 200 crew are lost, a number of bodies being washed up on the Isle of Man, with only 26 saved.
 March 14 – WWI:
 Battle of Más a Tierra: Off the coast of Chile, the British Royal Navy forces the Imperial German Navy light cruiser SMS Dresden (last survivor of the German East Asia Squadron) to scuttle.
 Constantinople Agreement: Britain, France and the Russian Empire agree to give Constantinople (Istanbul) and the Bosphorus to Russia in case of victory (the treaty is later nullified by the Bolshevik Revolution).
 March 18 – WWI:
 Gallipoli campaign: A Franco-British naval attack on the Dardanelles fails.
 British Royal Navy battleship  sinks German submarine U-29 with all hands in the Pentland Firth off the coast of Scotland by ramming her, the only time this tactic is known to have been successfully used by a battleship.
 March 19 – Pluto is photographed for the first time, but is not classified as a planet.
 March 26 – The Vancouver Millionaires win the Stanley Cup in ice hockey over the Ottawa Senators, 3 games to 0.
 March 28 – The first Roman Catholic liturgy at the newly consecrated Cathedral of Saint Paul, Minnesota, is celebrated by Archbishop John Ireland.

April 

 April 5 – Boxer Jess Willard, the latest "Great White Hope", defeats Jack Johnson with a 26th-round knockout in sweltering heat, at Havana, Cuba. Willard becomes very popular among white Americans, for "bringing back the championship to the white race".
 April 11 – Charlie Chaplin's film The Tramp is released in the United States.
 April 22 – WWI: Start of Second Battle of Ypres – Germany makes its first large scale use of poison gas on the Western Front.
 April 24 – Armenian genocide: deportation of Armenian notables from Istanbul begins.
 April 25 – WWI: Start of the Gallipoli Campaign by land forces (lasting until January 1916) – A landing at Anzac Cove is conducted by Australian and New Zealand Army Corps, and a landing at Cape Helles by British and French troops, to begin the Allied invasion of the Gallipoli peninsula in the Ottoman Empire.

 April 26 – Treaty of London: Italy secretly agrees to leave the Triple Alliance with Germany and Austria-Hungary, and join with the Entente Powers, in exchange for certain territories of Austria-Hungary on its borders.

May 

 May 1 –  WWI:
 General Louis Botha, Prime Minister of South Africa, leads the army in the occupation of German South West Africa.
 The Battle of Gorlice begins. It is one of the bloodiest battles of World War I.
 May 3 – Canadian soldier John McCrae writes the poem "In Flanders Fields".
 May 5 – WWI: Forces of the Ottoman Empire begin shelling ANZAC Cove from a new position behind their lines.
 May 6 – Imperial Trans-Antarctic Expedition: The SY Aurora broke loose from its anchorage during a gale, beginning a 312-day ordeal.
 May 7 – WWI: Sinking of the RMS Lusitania: 's main rival, the British ocean liner , is sunk by Imperial German Navy U-boat U-20 off the south-west coast of Ireland, killing 1,198 civilians en route from New York City to Liverpool. The best-known of the celebrities on board was Alfred Gwynne Vanderbilt. American sportsman (b. 1877)
 May 9 – WWI – Second Battle of Artois: German and French forces fight to a standstill; German forces defeat the British at the Battle of Aubers Ridge.
 May 17 – The last purely Liberal government in the United Kingdom ends, when the prime minister H. H. Asquith forms an all-party coalition government, the Asquith coalition ministry, effective May 25.
 May 19 – WWI: The third attack on Anzac Cove by Ottoman forces is repelled by the Australian and New Zealand Army Corps.
 May 22
 Quintinshill rail disaster in Scotland: The collision and fire kill 226, mostly troops, the largest number of fatalities in a rail accident in the United Kingdom.
 Lassen Peak, one of the Cascade Volcanoes in California, erupts, sending an ash plume 30,000 feet in the air, and devastating the nearby area with pyroclastic flows and lahars. It is the only volcano to erupt in the contiguous United States this century, until the 1980 eruption of Mount St. Helens.
 May 23 – WWI: Italy joins the Allies after declaring war on Austria-Hungary.
 May 25 – China agrees to the Twenty-One Demands of the Japanese.
 May 27 – Armenian genocide: The Tehcir Law is promulgated by the Turkish Ottoman Empire authorizing deportation of the Ottoman Armenian population to Deir ez-Zor in the Syrian desert, leading to the deaths of anywhere between 800,000 and over 1,500,000 civilians and confiscation of their property.
 May 28 – International Congress of Women meets at the Hague as a major peace initiative. 
 May 29 – Teófilo Braga becomes president of Portugal.

June 

 June – Armenian genocide: 15,000 civilians from the Ottoman Armenian population of Bitlis are massacred by Ottoman Turks and Kurds.
 June 3 – Mexican Revolution: Troops of Álvaro Obregón and Pancho Villa clash at León; Obregón loses his right arm in a grenade attack, but Villa is decisively defeated.
 June 5 – Women's suffrage in national elections is introduced in Denmark.
 June 9 – U.S. Secretary of State William Jennings Bryan resigns over a disagreement regarding his nation's handling of the sinking of the RMS Lusitania.
 June 11 – Friar Leonard Melki and hundreds of other Christians are driven out of Mardin and massacred by Ottoman troops.
 June 16 – Women's Institutes are established in Britain.
 June 19 – In Iceland, at this time a dependency of Denmark:
 Women's suffrage is granted to those over 40.
 The modern civil flag of Iceland is adopted officially.

July 

 July
 WWI: South West Africa Campaign – The Union of South Africa occupies German South West Africa with assistance from Canada, the United Kingdom, the Portuguese Republic and Portuguese Angola. South Africa will occupy South West Africa until March 1990.
 Armenian genocide: 17,000 civilians from the Ottoman Armenian population of Trebizond are massacred by Ottoman Turks.
 July 1 – WWI: In aerial warfare, German fighter pilot Kurt Wintgens becomes the first person to shoot down another plane, using a machine gun equipped with synchronization gear.
 July 7
 An extremely overloaded International Railway (New York–Ontario) trolleycar with 157 passengers crashes near Queenston, Ontario, resulting in 15 casualties.
 Sinhalese militia captain Henry Pedris is executed in British Ceylon for inciting race riots, a charge later proved false; he becomes a hero of the Sri Lankan independence movement.
 July 9 – WWI: Theodore Seitz, governor of German South West Africa, surrenders to General Louis Botha, between Otavi and Tsumeb.
 July 11 – WWI: Battle of Rufiji Delta – German cruiser  is forced to scuttle in the Rufiji River, German East Africa (present-day Tanzania).
 July 14 – The McMahon–Hussein Correspondence between Hussein bin Ali, Sharif of Mecca and the British official Henry McMahon concerning the Arab revolt against the Ottoman Empire begins; in exchange for assistance against the Ottomans, the British offer bin Ali their recognition of an independent Arab kingdom, although clear terms are never agreed.
 July 22 – WWI: The "Great Retreat" is ordered on the Eastern Front; Russian forces pull back out of Poland (at this time part of the Russian Empire), taking machinery and equipment with them.
 July 24 – Steamer  capsizes in central Chicago, with the loss of 844 lives.
 July 28 – The American occupation of Haiti (1915–34) begins.

August 

 August 5–23 – Hurricane Two of the 1915 Atlantic hurricane season over Galveston and New Orleans leaves 275 dead.
 August 6 – WWI: Battle of Sari Bair – The Allies mount a diversionary attack timed to coincide with a major Allied landing of reinforcements at Suvla Bay.
 August 16 – WWI: The Allies promises the Kingdom of Serbia, should victory be achieved over Austria-Hungary and its allied Central Powers, the territories of Baranja, Srem and Slavonia from the Cisleithanian part of the Dual Monarchy, Bosnia and Herzegovina, and eastern Dalmatia (from the river of Krka to Bar).

September 

 September 5 – The Zimmerwald Conference begins in Switzerland. 
 September 6 – The prototype military tank is first tested by the British Army.
 September 7 – Cartoonist John B. Gruelle is given a patent for his Raggedy Ann doll.
 September 8 – WWI: A Zeppelin raid destroys No. 61 Farringdon Road, London; it is rebuilt in 1917, and called The Zeppelin Building.
 September 11 – The Pennsylvania Railroad begins electrified commuter rail service between Paoli and Philadelphia, using overhead AC trolley wires for power. This type of system is later used in long-distance passenger trains between New York City, Washington, D.C., and Harrisburg, Pennsylvania.
 September 12 – French soldiers rescue over 4,000 Armenian genocide survivors stranded on Musa Dagh, a mountain in the Hatay province of Turkey.
 September 25–October 14 – WWI: Battle of Loos – British forces take the French town of Loos, but with substantial casualties, and are unable to press their advantage. This is the first time the British use poison gas in World War I, and also their first large-scale use of 'New' (or Kitchener's Army) units.
 September 30 – WWI: Serbian Army private Radoje Ljutovac becomes the first soldier in history to shoot down an enemy aircraft, with ground-to-air fire.

October 

 October 12 – WWI: British nurse Edith Cavell is executed by a German firing squad, for helping Allied soldiers escape from Belgium.
 October 15 – WWI: Serbian Campaign – Austria-Hungary invades the Kingdom of Serbia. Bulgaria enters the war, also invading Serbia. The Serbian First Army retreats towards Greece.
 October 16 – WWI: France declares war on Bulgaria.
 October 19
 WWI: Russia and Italy declare war on Bulgaria.
 Mexican Revolution: The U.S. recognizes the Mexican government of Venustiano Carranza de facto (not de jure until 1917).
 October 21 – The United Daughters of the Confederacy holds its first annual meeting outside the South, in San Francisco. Historian General Mildred Rutherford addresses the gathering on the "Historical Sins of Omission & Commission", of Yankee historians.
 October 23 – WWI: The torpedoing of armored cruiser  results in only 3 men being rescued from a crew of 675, the greatest single loss of life for the Imperial German Navy in the Baltic Sea during the war.
 October 25 – Lyda Conley, the first American Indian woman to appear before the Supreme Court of the United States as a lawyer, is admitted to practice there.
 October 27 – William Morris "Billy" Hughes becomes the 7th Prime Minister of Australia.
 October 28 – St. Johns School fire: Fire at St. John's School in Peabody, Massachusetts, claims the lives of 21 girls between the ages of 7 and 17.

November 

 November 18 – The U.S. silent film Inspiration, the first mainstream movie in which a leading actress (Audrey Munson) appears nude, is released.
 November 21 – British polar exploration ship Endurance finally breaks apart from pressure of ice around it and sinks into the Weddell Sea, stranding Ernest Shackleton's Imperial Trans-Antarctic Expedition party in the Antarctic. The wreck is discovered at a depth of 3,008 metres (9,869 ft), 107 years later in 2022.
 November 23 – The Triangle Film Corporation opens its new motion picture theater in Massillon, Ohio.
 November 24 – William J. Simmons revives the American Civil War era Ku Klux Klan at Stone Mountain, Georgia.
 November 25 – Albert Einstein presents part of his theory of general relativity to the Prussian Academy of Sciences.

December 

 December 10 – The 1 millionth Ford car rolls off the assembly line, at the River Rouge Plant in Detroit, Michigan.
 December 12 – President of the Republic of China Yuan Shikai declares himself Emperor.
 December 18 – United States President Woodrow Wilson marries Edith B. Galt, in Washington, D.C.
 December 23 – HMHS Britannic, which will be the largest British ship lost in WWI (though with only 30 fatalities), departs Liverpool on her maiden voyage as a hospital ship.
 December 26 – The Irish Republican Brotherhood Military Council decides to stage an Easter Rising in 1916.

Date unknown 
 Alfred Wegener publishes his theory of Pangaea.
 The first stop sign appears in Detroit.
 The Ancient Mystical Order Rosae Crucis is founded in the United States.
 Carrier Engineering, predecessor of Carrier Global, a global air conditioning brand, is founded in New Jersey, United States.

Births

January 

 January 1 
 Branko Ćopić, Yugoslav writer (d. 1984)
 Fazlollah Reza, Iranian university professor, electrical engineer (d. 2019)
 January 3 – Mady Rahl, German stage, film actress (d. 2009)
 January 4 – Adolf Opálka, Czechoslovak soldier (d. 1942)
 January 5 – Humberto Teixeira, Brazilian flautist (d. 1979)
 January 6 – Alan Watts, British philosopher (d. 1973)
 January 7 
 Franz Bartl, Austrian field handball player (d. 1941)
 Helen Mussallem, Canadian nursing administrator (d. 2012)
 January 9 – Anita Louise, American actress (d. 1970)
 January 11 – Robert Blair Mayne, British soldier, co-founder of the Special Air Service (d. 1955)
 January 16 – Susan Ahn Cuddy, United States Navy gunnery officer (d. 2015)
 January 17 – Sammy Angott, American boxer (d. 1980)
 January 18 – Santiago Carrillo, Spanish politician (d. 2012)
 January 20 – Ghulam Ishaq Khan, Pakistani civil servant, 7th President of Pakistan (d. 2006)
 January 23
W. Arthur Lewis, British economist, Nobel Prize laureate (d. 1991)
Potter Stewart, Associate Justice of the Supreme Court of the United States (d. 1985)
 January 24 – Robert Motherwell, American painter (d. 1991)
 January 25 – Ewan MacColl, English folk singer, songwriter, and poet (d. 1989)
 January 29
Albert Henderson, American actor (d. 2004)
V. V. Sadagopan, Indian film actor, music teacher, performer and composer (d. unknown)
 January 30
 Joachim Peiper, German Waffen-SS officer (d. 1976)
 John Profumo, British politician (d. 2006)
 January 31 – Thomas Merton, American monk, author (d. 1968)

February 

 February 1
 Alicia Rhett, American actress (d. 2014)
 Artur London, Czech statesman (d. 1986)
 Sir Stanley Matthews, English footballer (d. 2000)
 February 2
 Abba Eban, South African-born Israeli foreign affairs minister (d. 2002)
 Khushwant Singh, Indian writer (d. 2014)
 February 4
 Ray Evans, American composer (d. 2007)
 Sir Norman Wisdom, English comedian, singer, and actor (d. 2010)
 February 5 – Robert Hofstadter, American physicist, Nobel Prize laureate (d. 1990)
 February 6 – Danuta Szaflarska, Polish actress (d. 2017)
 February 7
 Teoctist Arăpașu, Ex-Romanian Orthodox Church Patriarch (d. 2007)
 Georges-André Chevallaz, 78th President of the Swiss Confederation (d. 2002)
 February 10 – Karl Winsch, American professional baseball player, manager (d. 2001)
 February 11 
 Patrick Leigh Fermor, British author (d. 2011)
 Harry Walker, English rugby union player (d. 2018)
 Richard Hamming, American mathematician (d. 1998)
 February 12
 Richard G. Colbert, American admiral (d. 1973)
 Lorne Greene, Canadian actor (d. 1987)
 Olivia Hooker, American civil rights figure (d. 2018)
 February 13 – Aung San, Burmese national leader (d. 1947)
 February 16
 Elisabeth Eybers, South African poet (d. 2007)
 Jim O'Hora, American college football coach (d. 2005)
 February 19
Fred Freiberger, American screenwriter, television producer (d. 2003)
John Freeman, British politician (d. 2014)
 February 20 – Danuta Szaflarska Polish screen, stage actress (d. 2017)
 February 21
 Ann Sheridan, American film actress (d. 1967)
 Anton Vratuša, 8th Prime Minister of Slovenia (d. 2017)
 February 23
Jon Hall, American actor (d. 1979)
Paul Tibbets, American World War II bomber pilot (Enola Gay) (d. 2007)
 February 25 – S. Rajaratnam, 1st Senior Minister of Singapore (d. 2006)
 February 27 – Dick Crockett, American actor, stunt performer (d. 1979)
 February 28
 Peter Medawar, Brazilian-born scientist, recipient of the Nobel Prize in Physiology or Medicine (d. 1987)
 Zero Mostel, American film, stage actor (d. 1977)

March 

 March 1 – Elizabeth Peet McIntosh, American spy (d. 2015)
 March 4 
László Csizsik-Csatáry, Hungarian convicted Nazi war criminal (d. 2013) 
Carlos Surinach, Spanish composer (d. 1997)
 March 5 – Sydney Sturgess, British-Canadian actress (d. 1999)
 March 6 
 Mary Ward, Australian actress (d. 2021)
 Syedna Mohammed Burhanuddin, Indian leader of the Dawoodi Bohra Community (d. 2014)
 March 7 – Jacques Chaban-Delmas, French politician, Prime Minister of France (d. 2000)
 March 8 – Drue Heinz, American literary publisher (d. 2018)
 March 9 – John Edgar "Johnnie" Johnson, English pilot (d. 2001)
 March 11 – Vijay Hazare, Indian cricketer (d. 2004)
 March 15 – Carl Emil Schorske, American cultural historian (d. 2015)
 March 17 – Bill Roycroft, Australian equestrian (d. 2011)
 March 19 – Patricia Morison, American actress (d. 2018)
 March 20
 Rudolf Kirchschläger, Austrian politician, 8th President of Austria (d. 2000)
 Sviatoslav Richter, Ukrainian pianist (d. 1997)
 Marie M. Runyon, American politician, activist (d. 2018)
 Sister Rosetta Tharpe, American singer (d. 1973)
 March 23
 Tom Pashby, Canadian ophthalmologist and sport safety advocate (d. 2005)
 Vasily Zaytsev, Soviet sniper (d. 1991)
 March 27 – Robert Lockwood Jr., American musician (d. 2006)
 March 28 – Jeremy Hutchinson, British lawyer, peer (d. 2017)
 March 30
 Brockway McMillan, American government official and scientist (d. 2016)
 Arsenio Erico, Paraguayan footballer (d. 1977)
 Pietro Ingrao, Italian politician (d. 2015)
 March 31 – Albert Hourani, English historian (d. 1993)

April 

 April 1 – O. W. Fischer, Austrian actor (d. 2004)
 April 3 
 Axel Axgil, Danish LGBT rights activist (d. 2011)
 Piet de Jong, Dutch politician, naval officer, Minister of Defence (1963–1967), and Prime Minister of the Netherlands (1967–1971) (d. 2016)
 Paul Touvier, French Nazi collaborator (d. 1996)
 April 4 – Dorothy Fay, American actress (d. 2003)
 April 6
 Tadeusz Kantor, Polish painter, assemblage designer and theatre director (d. 1990) 
 Thelma McKenzie, Australian cricketer (d. unknown)
 April 7
 Stanley Adams, American actor and screenwriter (d. 1977)
 Albert O. Hirschman, German-born economist (d. 2012)
 Billie Holiday, African-American singer (d. 1959)
 April 8 – Ivan Supek, Croatian physicist, author, and human rights activist (d. 2007)
 April 10
 Sardar Muhammad Ibrahim Khan, Kashmiri guerrilla leader (d. 2003)
 Harry Morgan, American actor and director (d. 2011)
 April 12 
 George Hogan, American professional basketball player (d. 1965)
 Hound Dog Taylor, American guitarist, singer (d. 1975)
 April 19 – Vonda Phelps, American actress (d. 2004)
 April 20
 Aurora Miranda, Brazilian singer and actress (d. 2005)
 Zita Szeleczky, Hungarian actress (d. 1999)
 April 21 – Anthony Quinn, Mexican actor (d. 2001)
 April 24 – Sam Burston, Australian farmer (d. 2015)
 April 29 – Donald Mills, lead tenor of the Mills Brothers (d. 1999)
 April 30 – Elio Toaff, Italian rabbi (d. 2015)

May 

 May 1 – Archie Williams, American athlete (d. 1993)
 May 2
 Van Alexander, American bandleader, arranger and composer (d. 2015)
 Doris Fisher, American singer and songwriter (d. 2003)
 May 3 
 Michele Cozzoli, Italian composer, conductor and arranger (d. 1961)
 Stu Hart, Canadian wrestling trainer (d. 2003)
 May 5 – Alice Faye, American entertainer (d. 1998)
 May 6
 Sydney Carter, British musician, poet and songwriter (d. 2004)
 Orson Welles, American actor and director (d. 1985)
 May 10
 Beyers Naudé, South African cleric, theologian and activist (d. 2004)
 Sir Denis Thatcher, British businessman, husband of Margaret Thatcher (d. 2003)
 May 12 
 Brother Roger, Swiss founder of the Taizé Community (d. 2005)
 Tadashi Sasaki, Japanese engineer (d. 2018)
 May 15
 Ida Keeling, American track and field athlete (d. 2021)
 Evelyn Owen, Australian gun designer (d. 1949)
 Paul Samuelson, American economist, Nobel Prize laureate (d. 2009)
 May 16 – Mario Monicelli, Italian film director (d. 2010)
 May 19 – Renée Asherson, British actress (d. 2014)
 May 20 – Moshe Dayan, Israeli military leader and politician (d. 1981)
 May 25 – Aarne Kainlauri, Finnish athlete (d. 2020)
 May 27
 Ester Soré, Chilean musician (d. 1996)
 Herman Wouk, American author (d. 2019)
 May 29 – Karl Münchinger, German conductor (d. 1990)
 May 31 – Carmen Herrera, Cuban-American painter (d. 2022)

June 

 June 1
 Johnny Bond, American country music singer and songwriter (d. 1978)
 John Randolph, American actor (d. 2004)
 June 2 
 Jason Lee, American politician and judge (d. 1980)
 Tapio Wirkkala, Finnish designer (d. 1985)
 June 3 – Milton Cato, Prime Minister of Saint Vincent and the Grenadines (d. 1997)
 June 4 – Modibo Keïta, 1st President of Mali (d. 1977)
 June 9 
 Ken Feltscheer, Australian rules footballer (d. 2017)
 Les Paul, American inventor and musician (d. 2009)
 June 10
 Saul Bellow, Canadian-born writer, Nobel Prize laureate (d. 2005)
 Peride Celal, Turkish author (d. 2013)
 Inia Te Wiata, New Zealand Māori bass-baritone opera singer, film actor, whakairo (carver) and artist (d. 1971)
 June 11
 Buddy Baer, American boxer and actor (d. 1986)
 Magda Gabor, Hungarian-American actress (d. 1997)
 June 12 
 William MacVane, American surgeon and politician (d. 2010)
 David Rockefeller, American banker and philanthropist (d. 2017)
 June 14 
 Loke Wan Tho, Singaporean business magnate, ornithologist, and photographer (d. 1964)
 Zoe Dell Nutter, American dancer, model, promoter, pilot and philanthropist (d. 2020)
 June 15
 Kaiser Matanzima, President of the Transkei bantustan (d. 2003)
 Nini Theilade, Danish ballet dancer, choreographer and teacher (d. 2018)
 Thomas Huckle Weller, American virologist, recipient of the Nobel Prize in Physiology or Medicine (d. 2008)
 June 16 – Mariano Rumor, Italian politician and Prime Minister of Italy from 1968 to 1970 and again from 1973 to 1974 (d. 1990)
 June 17
 Mario Echandi Jiménez, President of Costa Rica (d. 2011)
 Karl Targownik, Hungarian psychiatrist and Holocaust survivor (d. 1996)
 Walter J. Zable, American founder and CEO of Cubic Corporation (d. 2012)
 June 21 – Karol Miklosz, Polish-Soviet footballer, Soviet referee and Soviet-Ukrainian football administrator (d. 2003)
 June 22 
 Duncan Clark, Scottish athlete (d. 2003)
 Randolph Hokanson, American pianist (d. 2018)
 Hatsuko Morioka, Japanese freestyle swimmer
 Cornelius Warmerdam, American track & field athlete (d. 2001)
 June 24 
 Fred Hoyle, British astronomer (d. 2001)
 Bill Radovich, American football guard (d. 2002)
 June 25 – Floyd Boring, American Secret Service agent (d. 2008)
 June 26
 George Haigh, English professional footballer (d. 2019)
 Charlotte Zolotow, American author (d. 2013)
 June 27 
 Grace Lee Boggs, American author, social activist, and philosopher (d. 2015)
 Graham Botting, New Zealand cricketer and hockey (d. 2007)
 John Alexander Moore, American zoology professor emeritus (d. 2002)
 June 28 
 David "Honeyboy" Edwards, American musician (d. 2011)
 Muzz Patrick, Canadian ice hockey player and coach (d. 1998)
 Carmen Vidal, Spanish cosmetologist and businesswoman (d. 2003)
 June 29 – John Charles Cutler, American surgeon (d. 2003)
 June 30 
 Oskar-Hubert Dennhardt, German officer (d. 2014)
 Robert E. Hopkins, president of the Optical Society of America in 1973 (d. 2009)

July 

 July 1
 A. F. M. Ahsanuddin Chowdhury, 9th President of Bangladesh (d. 2001)
 Willie Dixon, American blues musician (d. 1992)
 Philip Lever, 3rd Viscount Leverhulme, British peer (d. 2000)
 Rudolf Pernický, Czechoslovak soldier and paratrooper (d. 2005)
 July 3
 Ralph Chapin, American businessman (d. 2000)
 Marta Grandi, Italian entomologist (d. 2005)
 July 4 – Timmie Rogers, American actor and singer-songwriter (d. 2006)
 July 5 
 Yu Guangyuan, Chinese economist (d. 2013)
 Al Timothy, Trinidadian musician (d. 2000)
 John Woodruff, American athlete (d. 2007)
 July 6 – Javare Gowda, Indian language author (d. 2016)
 July 7
 Reynaldo Guerra Garza, American judge (d. 2004)
 Billy Mure, American guitarist (d. 2013)
 July 8 
 Lowell English, United States Marine Corps general (d. 2005)
 Neil D. Van Sickle, American Air Force major general (d. 2019)
 July 9 
 Joan Tompkins, American actress (d. 2005)
 July 10 – Kevin Barrett, Australian rules footballer (d. 1984)
 July 11 – Leonard Goodwin, British protozoologist (d. 2008)
 July 12 
 Princess Catherine Ivanovna of Russia (d. 2007)
 Emanuel Papper, American anesthesiologist, professor, and author (d. 2002)
 July 13 
 Tex Hill, Korean-American fighter pilot and flying ace (d. 2007)
 Paul Williams, African American jazz and blues saxophonist, bandleader and songwriter (d. 2002)
 July 14 – Harold Pupkewitz, Namibian entrepreneur (d. 2012)
 July 15
 William O. Baker, president of Bell Labs (d. 2005) 
 Alicia Zubasnabar de De la Cuadra, Argentine human rights activist (d. 2008)
 A. A. Englander, British television cinematographer (d. 2004)
 Kashmir Singh Katoch, Indian military advisor (d. 2007)
 Alexandru Usatiuc-Bulgăr, Moldovan activist (d. 2003)
 July 16 – Elaine Barrie, American actress (d. 2003)
 July 17 – Fred Ball, American movie studio executive, actor, and brother of comedian Lucille Ball (d. 2007)
 July 18 
 Roxana Cannon Arsht, American judge (d. 2003)
 Carequinha, Brazilian clown, actor (d. 2006)
 Louis Le Bailly, British Royal Navy officer (d. 2010)
 July 19 
 Rita Childers, First Lady of Ireland (1973–1974) (d. 2010)
 Katherine Sanford, American biologist (d. 2005)
 July 20 
 Matest M. Agrest, Russian-Jewish mathematician (d. 2005)
 Gene Hasson, American Major League Baseball infielder (d. 2003)
 July 24 – Enrique Fernando, Chief Justice of the Philippine Supreme Court (d. 2004)
 July 25
 S. U. Ethirmanasingham, Sri Lankan businessman and politician 
 Julio Iglesias, Sr., Spanish gynecologist, father of Julio Iglesias (d. 2005)
 Joseph P. Kennedy Jr., American fighter pilot, elder brother of John F. Kennedy (d. 1944)
 July 26 – K. Pattabhi Jois, Indian yogi (d. 2009)
 July 28
 Red Barrett, American baseball player (d. 1990)
 Charles Hard Townes, American physicist, Nobel Prize laureate (d. 2015)
 Frankie Yankovic, American accordion player (d. 1998)

August 

 August 2 
 Gary Merrill, American actor (d. 1990)
 Neville Wigram, 2nd Baron Wigram, British army officer (d. 2017)
 August 3
 Frank Arthur Calder, Canadian politician (d. 2006)
 Pete Newell, Canadian-born basketball coach (d. 2008)
 August 4 – William Keene, American actor (d. 1992)
 August 8 
 Alex Schoenbaum, American collegiate football player and businessman (d. 1996)
 María Rostworowski, Peruvian historian (d. 2016)
 Joseph P. Graw, American businessman and politician (d. 2018)
 August 9 – George W. BonDurant, American preacher (d. 2017)
 August 12 
 Donald Pellmann, American masters athlete (d. 2020)
 Michael Kidd, American choreographer (d. 2007)
 August 14 
 Vincent Foy, Canadian Roman Catholic cleric, theologian (d. 2017)
 Irene Hickson, American professional baseball player (d. 1995)
 August 16 – Herbert Greenwald, American real estate developer (d. 1959)
 August 18 – Joseph Arthur Ankrah, 2nd President of Ghana (d. 1992)
 August 19 – Ring Lardner Jr., American film screenwriter (d. 2000)
 August 21 – Arnold Goodman, Baron Goodman, British lawyer, political adviser (d. 1995)
 August 24 
 Dave McCoy, American founder of the Mammoth Mountain Ski Area (d. 2020)
 Wynonie Harris, African-American blues, rhythm and blues singer (d. 1969)
 August 25 – Walter Trampler, American violist (d. 1997)
 August 27 – Norman F. Ramsey, American physicist, Nobel Prize laureate (d. 2011)
 August 28
 Tol Avery, American actor (d. 1973)
 Simon Oakland, American actor (d. 1983)
 Max Robertson, British sports commentator (d. 2009)
 August 29 – Ingrid Bergman, Swedish actress (d. 1982)
 August 30
 Princess Lilian, Duchess of Halland, British-born Swedish princess (d. 2013)
 Robert Strassburg, American composer (d. 2003)
 August 31 – Víctor Pey, Spanish-Chilean engineer (d. 2018)

September 

 September 2 – Meinhardt Raabe, American actor (d. 2010)
 September 3
 Knut Nystedt, Norwegian composer (d. 2014)
 Eddie Stanky, American baseball player and manager (d. 1999)
 September 6 – Franz Josef Strauss, German politician (d. 1988)
 September 7 – Richard E. Cole, American air force officer (d. 2019)
 September 8 – Frank Cady, American actor (d. 2012)
 September 9 – Richard Webb, American actor (d. 1993)
 September 10
 Viva Leroy Nash, American murderer, oldest death row inmate (d. 2010)
 Edmond O'Brien, American actor (d. 1985)
 Robert Sparr, American film director and screenwriter (d. 1969)
 September 11 – Raúl Alberto Lastiri, 39th President of Argentina (d. 1978)
 September 14
 John Dobson, American astronomer (d. 2014)
 Douglas Kennedy, American actor (d. 1973)
 September 15
 Helmut Schön, German football player, manager (d. 1996)
 Albert Whitlock, British-born matte artist (d. 1999)
 September 16 – Eddie Filgate, Irish politician (d. 2017)
 September 17 – M. F. Husain, Indian artist (d. 2011)
 September 19 – Germán Valdés, Mexican actor, singer and comedian (d. 1973)
 September 20 – Malik Meraj Khalid, Prime Minister of Pakistan (d. 2003)
 September 22 – Bernardino Piñera, Chilean Roman Catholic bishop (d. 2020)
 September 23
 Julius Baker, American flautist (d. 2003)
 Zdenko Blažeković, Croatian politician (d. 1947)
 Clifford Shull, American physicist, Nobel Prize laureate (d. 2001)
 September 24 – Joseph Montoya, American politician (d. 1978)
 September 27 – Ira Colitz, American politician (d. 1998)
 September 28 – Kay Mander, British film director, shooting continuity specialist (d. 2013)
 September 29 
 Vincent DeDomenico, American entrepreneur (d. 2007)
 Brenda Marshall, American actress (d. 1992)
 September 30
 Nadezhda Fedutenko, Soviet red army officer (d. 1978)
 Lester Maddox, Governor of Georgia (d. 2003)

October 

 October 1
 Jerome Bruner, American psychologist (d. 2016) 
 Talat Tunçalp, Turkish Olympian cyclist (d. 2017)
 October 2 – Chuck Williams, American businessman (d. 2015)
 October 6 – Neus Català, Spanish political activist (d. 2019)
 October 7 – Walter Keane, American plagiarist (d. 2000)
 October 11 – T. Llew Jones, Welsh author, poet (d. 2009)
 October 12
 José Bragato, Italian-born Argentine cellist, composer, conductor and arranger (d. 2017)
 Tony Rafty, Australian caricaturist (d. 2015)
 October 13 – Frederick Rosier, British Royal Air Force commander (d. 1998)
 October 14 – Loris Francesco Capovilla, Italian Roman Catholic prelate (d. 2016)
 October 17 
 Victor Garaygordóbil Berrizbeitia, Spanish Roman Catholic bishop (d. 2018)
 H. Basil S. Cooke, Canadian geologist, palaeontologist (d. 2018)
 John J. McKetta, American chemical engineer (d. 2019)
 Arthur Miller, American playwright (d. 2005)
 October 18 – Thomas Round, English opera singer, actor (d. 2016)
 October 19 – Andreas Peter Cornelius Sol, Dutch prelate (d. 2016)
 October 21 – Aleksandr Ezhevsky, Soviet engineer, statesman (d. 2017)
 October 22 – Yitzhak Shamir, Israeli politician (d. 2012)
 October 23 – Shin Hyun-joon, South Korean general (d. 2007)
 October 24 – Bob Kane, American comic book artist/writer, co-creator of Batman (d. 1998)
 October 27 – Harry Saltzman, Canadian theatre, film producer (d. 1994)
 October 28 – Dody Goodman, American actress, dancer (d. 2008)
 October 29 – William Berenberg, American physician (d. 2005)

November 

 November 1 
 Marion Eugene Carl, U.S. Marine Corps World War II fighter ace, test pilot (d. 1998)
 Frances Hesselbein, American President, CEO of the Frances Hesselbein Leadership Institute (d. 2022)
 Eva Macapagal, 9th First Lady of the Philippines (d. 1999)
 November 2 – Kay Armen, American Armenian singer (d. 2011)
 November 4 
 Wee Kim Wee, 4th President of Singapore (d. 2005)
 Ismail Abdul Rahman, Malaysian politician (d. 1973)
 November 7 
 Philip Morrison, American physicist, astrophysicist and professor (d. 2005) 
 Jiao Ruoyu, Chinese Communist Party politician (d. 2020) 
 November 8 – Richard Luyt, 1st Governor General of Guyana (d. 1994)
 November 9 – Sargent Shriver, American politician (d. 2011)
 November 11
 William Proxmire, United States Senator (d. 2005)
 Anna Schwartz, American economist (d. 2012)
 November 12 – Roland Barthes, French philosopher, literary critic (d. 1980)
 November 13 – Clara Marangoni, Italian gymnast (d. 2018) 
 November 17 – Albert Malbois, French prelate (d. 2017)
 November 18 – James Whittico Jr., American physician (d. 2018)
 November 19 – Earl Wilbur Sutherland Jr., American physiologist, Nobel Prize laureate (d. 1974)
 November 20 – Bill Daniel, American politician (d. 2006)
 November 23 
 John Dehner, American actor (d. 1992)
 Julio César Méndez Montenegro, President of Guatemala (d. 1996)
 November 25 
 Augusto Pinochet, 31st President of Chile (d. 2006)
 Armando Villanueva, leader of the Peruvian American Popular Revolutionary Alliance (d. 2013)
 November 29
 Eugene Polley, American electronics engineer (d. 2012)
 Billy Strayhorn, American jazz pianist-composer (d. 1967)
 November 30
 Brownie McGhee, American musician (d. 1996)
 Emmanuel Pelaez, 6th Vice President of the Philippines (d. 2003)
 Henry Taube, Canadian-born chemist, Nobel Prize laureate (d. 2005)

December 

 December 2
 Prince Takahito of Mikasa, younger brother of Japanese Emperor Hirohito (d. 2016) 
 Marais Viljoen, President of South Africa (d. 2007)
 December 5 – Ren Xinmin, Chinese aerospace engineer (d. 2017)
 December 6 – Alan Sayers, New Zealand journalist, photographer and athlete (d. 2017)
 December 7 – Eli Wallach, American actor (d. 2014)
 December 8 – Ernest Lehman, American screenwriter (d. 2005)
 December 9 – Elisabeth Schwarzkopf, German-born soprano (d. 2006)
 December 12
 Felicity Hill, British Royal Air Force officer (d. 2019)
 Frank Sinatra, American singer, actor (d. 1998)
 December 13
 Curd Juergens, Austrian-German film actor (d. 1982) 
 B. J. Vorster, South African politician, Prime Minister and State President (d. 1983)
 December 14 – Dan Dailey, American actor, dancer (d. 1978)
 December 15
Kenshiro Abbe, Japanese master of judo, aikido, and kendo (d. 1985)
Charles F. Wheeler, American cinematographer (d. 2004)
 December 17 – Robert A. Dahl, American political scientist (d. 2014)
 December 18 – Bill Zuckert, American actor (d. 1997)
 December 19
 Ke Hua, Chinese diplomat (d. 2019)
 Édith Piaf, French singer (d. 1963)
 December 21 – Werner von Trapp, member of the Austrian Trapp Family Singers (d. 2007)
 December 22 – Barbara Billingsley, American actress (d. 2010)
 December 27
 Mary Kornman, American child actress (d. 1973)
 Gyula Zsengellér, Hungarian footballer (d. 1999)
 December 31 – Davuldena Gnanissara Thero, Sri Lankan Buddhist monk (d. 2017)

Deaths

January 

 January 9 – Yang Shoujing, Chinese historical geographer and calligrapher (b. 1839)
 January 10 – Marshall Pinckney Wilder, American actor, humorist, comedian and monologist (b. 1859)
 January 13 – Mary Slessor, Scottish Christian missionary (b. 1848)
 January 14 – Richard Meux Benson, English founder of an Anglican religious order (b. 1824)
 January 18 – Anatoly Stessel, Russian baron and general (b. 1848)
 January 19 – Anna Leonowens (Anna of The King and I) (b. 1831)
 January 22 – James M. Spangler, American inventor (b. 1848)

February 
 February 3 – Bosnian Serb conspirators (executed for their part in the assassination of Archduke Franz Ferdinand of Austria):
 Veljko Čubrilović (b. 1886)
 Danilo Ilić (b. 1891)
 Miško Jovanović (b. 1878)
 February 5 – Ross Barnes, American baseball player (b. 1850)
 February 18 
 Francisco Giner de los Ríos, Spanish philosopher, educator (b. 1839)
 Frank James, American outlaw (b. 1843)
 February 22 – Sir John Gough, British general, Victoria Cross recipient (killed in action) (b. 1871)
 February 26 –Edward Richardson, New Zealand engineer and politician (b. 1831)

March 
 March 4 – William Willett, English promoter of daylight saving time (b. 1856)
 March 13 – Sergei Witte, Russian aristocrat, statesman and Prime Minister (b. 1849)
 March 14 – Lincoln J. Beachey, American pilot (b. 1887)

 March 15 – George Llewelyn Davies, English soldier, inspiration for the "Lost Boys" of Peter Pan (killed in action) (b. 1893)
 March 21 – Frederick Winslow Taylor, American engineer, economist (b. 1856)
 March 24 − Morgan Robertson, American author (b. 1861)
 March 31 
 Wyndham Halswelle, Scottish runner (killed in action) (b. 1882)
 Nathan Rothschild, 1st Baron Rothschild, British banker and politician (b. 1840)

April 
 April 4 – Andrew Stoddart, English sportsman (b. 1863)
 April 9 – Friedrich Loeffler, German bacteriologist (b. 1852)
 April 26 – Ida Hunt Udall, American Latter-day Saint diarist (b. 1858)
 April 16 – Nelson W. Aldrich, U.S. Senator from Rhode Island (b. 1841)
 April 20 – Daniel Webster Jones, American Latter-day Saint pioneer (b. 1830)
 April 23
 Rupert Brooke, English poet (sepsis from an infected mosquito bite on active service) (b. 1887) 
 Frederick Fisher, Canadian recipient of Victoria Cross (killed in action) (b. 1894)
 April 25 – Frederick W. Seward, American politician (b. 1830)
 April 26 – John Bunny, American actor (b. 1863)
 April 27
 William Barnard Rhodes-Moorhouse, English airman, first aviator awarded Victoria Cross (b. 1887)
 Alexander Scriabin, Russian composer (b. 1872)
April 30 - Edward D. Easton, founder and president of Columbia Phonograph Company

May 
 May 7 – Alfred Gwynne Vanderbilt, American sportsman (b. 1877; died in the Sinking of the RMS Lusitania) 
 May 9 
 François Faber, Luxembourgian cyclist (killed in action) (b. 1887)
 Anthony Wilding, New Zealand tennis player (killed in action) (b. 1883)
 May 18 – Sir William Bridges, Australian army general (b. 1861)
 May 24 – John Condon, Irish private soldier in British Army, claimed as youngest British soldier to die in WWI (killed in action) (b. 1896)
 May 26 
 Emil Lask, German philosopher (killed in action) (b. 1875)
 Julian Grenfell, English poet (killed in action) (b. 1888)
 May 30 – Marcelo Azcárraga Palmero, 3-time Prime Minister of Spain (b. 1832)
 May 31 – Victor Child Villiers, 7th Earl of Jersey, 18th Governor of New South Wales (b. 1845)

June 
 June 5 – Henri Gaudier-Brzeska, French artist and sculptor (killed in action) (b. 1891)
 June 7 – Charles Reed Bishop, American businessman, philanthropist in Hawaii (b. 1822)
 June 10 – Ignatius Maloyan, Armenian Eastern Catholic archbishop and blessed (b. 1869)
 June 13 – Zbigniew Dunin-Wasowicz, Polish military leader (killed in action) (b. 1882)
 June 19 – Benjamin F. Isherwood, American admiral, United States Navy Engineer-in-Chief (b. 1822)
 June 25 – Tok Janggut, Malayan rebel leader (killed in action) (b. 1853)

July 

 July 2 – Porfirio Díaz, 29th President of Mexico (b. 1830)
 July 6 – Lawrence Hargrave, Australian engineer (b. 1850)
 July 10 – Alice Bellvadore Sams Turner, American physician (b. 1859)
 July 16 – Ellen G. White, American prophetess, co-founder of the Seventh-day Adventist Church, most translated American author (b. 1827)
 July 18 – Ozra Amander Hadley, American politician (b. 1826)
 July 22 – Sir Sandford Fleming, Canadian engineer and inventor (b. 1827)
 July 25 – Virginie Amélie Avegno Gautreau, American-born French socialite, model for the painting Portrait of Madame X (b. 1859)
 July 30 – Charles Becker, American policeman and murderer (executed) (b. 1870)

August 
 August 10 – Henry Moseley, English physicist (killed in action) (b. 1887)
 August 16 – Kálmán Széll, 13th Prime Minister of Hungary (b. 1843)
 August 17 – Leo Frank, Jewish-American factory superintendent who was falsely convicted of the murder of Mary Phagan (b. 1884)
 August 20 
 Paul Ehrlich, German scientist, recipient of the Nobel Prize in Physiology or Medicine (b. 1854)
 Carlos Finlay, Cuban pathologist (b. 1833)
 August 21 – Josiah T. Settle, American lawyer and politician (b. 1850)
 August 30 
 Antonio Flores Jijón, 13th President of Ecuador (b. 1833)
 Pascual Orozco, Mexican revolutionary (b. 1882)
 August 31 – Adolphe Pégoud, French acrobatic pilot, World War I fighter ace (killed in action) (b. 1889)

September 
 September 1 – August Stramm, German poet, playwright (killed in action) (b. 1874)
 September 9
 Antonín Petrof, Czech piano maker (b. 1839)
 Albert Spalding, American baseball player, sporting goods manufacturer (b. 1850)
 September 11 – William Sprague IV, American politician from Rhode Island (b. 1830)
 September 13 – Andrew L. Harris, American Civil War hero, 44th Governor of Ohio (b. 1835)
 September 21 – Anthony Comstock, American anti-indecency reformer (b. 1844)
 September 26 – Keir Hardie, British labour leader (b. 1856)
 September 27 – Fergus Bowes-Lyon, brother of Queen Elizabeth The Queen Mother (killed in action) (b. 1889)

October 
 October 4
 Karl Staaff, 11th Prime Minister of Sweden (b. 1860)
 John Rigby, grandfather of Eleanor Rigby, to whom Paul McCartney attributes a subconscious influence on naming the song with the same name (b.1843)
 October 7 – Friedrich Hasenöhrl, Austrian physicist (b. 1874)
 October 10 – Albert Cashier, born Jennie Hodgers, Irish American soldier (b. 1843)
 October 12 – Edith Cavell, British nurse, war heroine (shot) (b. 1865)
 October 13 – Charles Sorley, British poet (killed in action) (b. 1895)
 October 15 – Theodor Boveri, German biologist (b. 1862)
 October 16 – Zdeňka Wiedermannová-Motyčková, Moravian pioneer of female education (heart attack) (b. 1868)
 October 22 – Wilhelm Windelband, German philosopher (b. 1848)
 October 23 – W. G. Grace, English cricketer (b. 1848)
 October 26 – August Bungert, German composer, poet (b. 1845)
 October 30 – Sir Charles Tupper, 6th Prime Minister of Canada (b. 1821)
 October 31 – Blanche Walsh, American actress (b. 1873)

November 

 November 14 
 Theodor Leschetizky, Polish pianist and composer (b. 1830)
 Booker T. Washington, American educator (b. 1856)
 November 15 – Félix de Blochausen, 6th Prime Minister of Luxembourg (b. 1834)
 November 21 – Dixie Haygood, American magician (b. 1861)
 November 28 – Mubarak Al-Sabah, Emir of Kuwait (b. 1837)

December 
 December 18 – Sir Henry Roscoe, English chemist (b. 1833)
 December 18 – Édouard Vaillant, French Socialist politician (b. 1840)
 December 19 – Alois Alzheimer, German psychiatrist, neuropathologist (b. 1864)
 December 22 – Rose Talbot Bullard, American medical doctor, professor (b. 1864)
 December 31 – Tommaso Salvini, Italian actor (b. 1829)

Nobel Prizes 

 Chemistry – Richard Willstätter
 Literature – Romain Rolland
 Medicine – not awarded
 Peace – not awarded
 Physics – William Henry Bragg and William Lawrence Bragg

Notes

Further reading
 Williams, John. The Other Battleground The Home Fronts: Britain, France and Germany 1914–1918 (1972) pp 43–108.

Primary sources and year books
 New International Year Book 1915, Comprehensive coverage of world and national affairs, 791pp
 Hazell's Annual for 1916 (1916), worldwide events of 1915; 640pp online; worldwide coverage of 1915 events; emphasis on Great Britain

External links 
 Pictures of the 1915 Galveston Hurricane at the University of Houston Digital Library